The 1965 European Amateur Boxing Championships  were held in East Berlin, East Germany from 22 to 29 May. The 16th edition of the bi-annual competition was organised by the European governing body for amateur boxing, EABA. There were 172 fighters from 24 countries participating.

Medal winners

Medal table

External links
Results
Amateur Boxing

European Amateur Boxing Championships
Boxing
European Amateur Boxing Championships
Boxing
International boxing competitions hosted by Germany